Gardner Lake State Park is a public recreation area occupying  on the southern edge of Gardner Lake in the town of Salem, Connecticut. The state park offers opportunities for boating, fishing, and swimming  and is managed by the Connecticut Department of Energy and Environmental Protection.

History
For most of the 20th century, the site of the state park was a private resort. The state purchased the site in 2001 for US$550,000 after previous efforts to purchase it in the 1990s by local government were rejected by voters. In 2008, the state invested a million dollars in improvements to the park's boat launch and parking area. Those improved facilities contributed to a marked upturn in public use.

Activities and amenities
The park offers a swimming beach and boat launch.

In the news
In 2012, 2013, and 2016, reports of disruptive behavior and the failure of visitors to pack out trash led to calls for increased vigilance by authorities and more cooperation from the public.

References

External links
 Gardner Lake State Park Connecticut Department of Energy and Environmental Protection

State parks of Connecticut
Salem, Connecticut
Parks in New London County, Connecticut
Protected areas established in 2001
2001 establishments in Connecticut